Sukerijärvi Strict Nature Reserve (Sukerijärven luonnonpuisto) is a strict nature reserve located in Northern Ostrobothnia, Finland. This reserve resembles parts of Oulanka National Park, which has popular backpacking trails. There is no public access.

Strict nature reserves of Finland
Geography of North Ostrobothnia
Kuusamo